Sog (also Sogba) is a town and seat of Sog County in the Nagqu Prefecture of the Tibet Autonomous Region of China. It lies on the G317 highway between Zala and Baqên Town.

See also
List of towns and villages in Tibet Autonomous Region

Populated places in Nagqu
Township-level divisions of Tibet